Maurice Browne (12 February 1881 – 21 January 1955), born in Reading, England, was best known as a theater producer in the United States and the UK. The Cambridge-educated Browne was also a poet, actor, and theater director. He has been credited, along with his then-wife Ellen Van Volkenburg, with being the founder of the Little Theatre Movement in America through his work with the Chicago Little Theatre. Browne and Van Volkenburg went on to found the department of drama at the Cornish School in Seattle in 1918. Browne's greatest triumph came in 1929 when he produced Journey's End, by R. C. Sherriff in London.

References

Browne, Maurice. Too Late to Lament: An Autobiography. London, Gollancz, 1955.
Chansky, Dorothy. Composing Ourselves: The Little Theatre Movement and the American Audience. Carbondale, Seattle, Southern Illinois University, 2004.
Cheney, Sheldon. The New Movement in the Theatre. New York, Mitchell Kennerley, 1914.
Cornish, Nellie C. Miss Aunt Nellie: The Autobiography of Nellie C. Cornish, Ellen Van Volkenburg Browne and Edward Nordhoff Beck, eds. Seattle, University of Washington, 1964.

External links
 

British male stage actors
American male stage actors
British poets
British theatre directors
American theatre directors
1881 births
1955 deaths
20th-century American poets